Pleurobema furvum, the dark pigtoe, is a species of freshwater mussel in the family Unionidae, the river mussels. This aquatic bivalve mollusk is native to Alabama in the United States, where it is mainly limited to the Black Warrior River. It is a federally listed endangered species of the United States.

References

Endemic fauna of Alabama
furvum
ESA endangered species
Bivalves described in 1834
Taxonomy articles created by Polbot